Castellanos is a Spanish habitational surname with the meaning "[from a place founded or inhabited by] Castilians". Notable people with the surname include:

Arts
Antonio Castellanos (born 1946), Mexican sculptor
Enrique Abaroa Castellanos, Mexican landscape artist
Evencio Castellanos (1915–1984), Venezuelan pianist and classical musician
Horacio Castellanos Moya (born 1957), Salvadoran writer
Jesus Castellanos (1878–1912), Cuban writer, journalist and lawyer
John Castellanos (born 1957), American actor
Juan de Castellanos, 16th-century Colombian poet
Julio Castellanos (1905–1947), Mexican painter and engraver
Lincoln A. Castellanos, American actor
Manuel Castellanos López (born 1949), Cuban graphic artist
Mirla Castellanos, Venezuelan singer
Rafael Antonio Castellanos (c. 1725–1791), Guatemalan classical composer
Rosario Castellanos (1925–1974), Mexican poet and author
Teo Castellanos, American theater director
Vincent Castellanos (born 1961), American actor

Government
Aarón Castellanos (1799–1880), Argentine businessman and military commander
Adolfo Jiménez Castellanos (1844–1929), last Spanish Governor General of Cuba
Alex Castellanos (born 1954), Cuban-American political consultant
Carlos Octavio Castellanos (born 1977), Mexican politician
César Castellanos (1947–1998), Honduran politician
Gumercindo Castellanos (born 1953), Mexican politician
José Castellanos Contreras (1893–1977), Salvadoran army colonel and diplomat
Martín Ramos Castellanos (born 1961), Mexican politician
Milton Castellanos Everardo (1920–2011), Mexican politician and lawyer
Roberto Domínguez Castellanos (born 1954), Mexican politician
Sara Isabel Castellanos Cortés (born 1946), Mexican politician
Sergio Arturo Castellanos (born 1969), Honduran politician
Victoriano Castellanos (1795–1862), President of Honduras 
Wilfredo Bustillo Castellanos (born 1958), Honduran politician

Religion
César Castellanos, Colombian pastor
Claudia Rodríguez de Castellanos, Colombian evangelical pastor
Leonardo Castellanos y Castellanos (1862−1912), Mexican Catholic bishop
Pedro Castellanos (1902–1961), Mexican priest and architect

Science
Agustin Walfredo Castellanos (1902–2000), Cuban-American physician
Antonio Castellanos Mata (1947–2016), Spanish physicist
Francisco Xavier Castellanos (born 1953), American neuroscientist
Julieta Castellanos (born 1954), Honduran sociologist and president of the National Autonomous University of Honduras

Sports
Alejandro Castellanos (born 1979), Honduran swimmer
Alex Castellanos (baseball) (born 1986), American baseball player
David Castellanos (born 1980), American soccer player
Deyna Castellanos (born 1999), Venezuelan women's soccer player
Franklin Castellanos (born 1990), Honduran footballer
Humberto Castellanos (born 1998), Mexican baseball player
Jesús Antonio Castellanos (born 1978), Spanish footballer
Leandro Castellanos (born 1984), Colombian footballer
Marianella Castellanos (born 1984), Venezuelan softball player
Nick Castellanos (born 1992), American baseball player
Santiago Castellanos (born 1977), Spanish swimmer
Víctor Castellanos (born 1934), Guatemalan sports shooter

Other
Luis Castellanos Tapias, Colombian lawyer
Migbelis Castellanos (born 1995), Venezuelan model and beauty queen
AC

See also
Mateo Castellanos, a fictional character from the ITV sitcom Benidorm
Sebastian Castellanos, the main character in The Evil Within series
Castellanos (disambiguation)
Castellano (surname)

References

Spanish-language surnames